Boreosomus gillioti is an extinct species of Triassic ray-finned fish.

Fossil record
This species is known in the fossil record from the Early Triassic (from about 252,3 to 251,3 million years ago). Fossils of this quite rare species have been found in Madagascar.

Description
These small to medium sized extinct fishes had a slender body and a small dorsal fin located before the body's midpoint. Caudal fin were divided. Scales were strong and rectangular.

See also

 Prehistoric fish
 List of prehistoric bony fish

References

Ptycholepiformes

Fish described in 1924
Fossils of Africa